A creditor is a party that has a claim on the services of a second party.

Creditors may also refer to:

 Creditors (play), Swedish play
 Creditors (1988 film), film based on the play
 Creditors (2015 film), film based on the play
 Menachem Creditor, an American rabbi